Savannah Lee Levin (born May 21, 1995) is an American soccer player who played as a defender for Kopparbergs/Göteborg FC in the Swedish Damallsvenskan. At the University of Southern California (USC) from 2013 to 2016, she played for the USC Trojans women's soccer team that won the 2016 NCAA Division I Women's Soccer Tournament.

Early life

Levin's parents are Desmond and Diane Levin. She has a brother, Jay, and an older  sister, Camille Levin, who played soccer played for the Stanford Cardinal women's soccer team that won the 2011 NCAA Division I Women's Soccer Tournament, in 2013 was the captain of the United States U-23 women's national soccer team, played for the Orlando Pride of the NWSL, and plays soccer for Vålerenga in the Toppserien in Norway. She grew up in Newport Coast, California.

Soccer career
In 2012, Levin played for Cal South's team that won the Olympic Development Program national championships in Frisco, Texas.

In high school Levin was named league MVP in soccer all four years at Tarbut V' Torah (class of 2013) in Irvine, California, where she was a four-time first team all-league selection.

Levin played on the USA Women's Soccer Team at the 2013 Maccabiah Games in Israel.

Levin played at the University of Southern California (USC) from 2013 to 2016, where she was part of the USC Trojans women's soccer team that won the 2016 NCAA Division I Women's Soccer Tournament. As a sophomore in 2014 and as a junior in 2015 she earned Pac-12 All-Academic honorable mention. In 2016 she was named All Pac-12 First Team. At USC she majored in psychology.

Levin declared for the 2017 NWSL College Draft but was not selected, in February 2017 she signed with Swedish team Kopparbergs/Göteborg FC to play in the Damallsvenskan, for whom she played as a midfielder in 2017.

In 2018 she was inducted into the Southern California Jewish Sports Hall of Fame.

References

External links
 
 USC player profile
 
 
 

1995 births
Living people
American women's soccer players
Sportspeople from Newport Beach, California
Soccer players from California
USC Trojans women's soccer players
BK Häcken FF players
Damallsvenskan players
Expatriate women's footballers in Sweden
American people of South African-Jewish descent
Jewish footballers
Jewish sportswomen
Jewish American sportspeople
Women's association football defenders
Competitors at the 2013 Maccabiah Games
Maccabiah Games competitors for the United States
Maccabiah Games footballers
21st-century American Jews
21st-century American women